Dipleuchlanis is a genus of rotifers belonging to the family Euchlanidae.

The species of this genus are found in Europe and Northern America.

Species:
 Dipleuchlanis elegans (Wierzejski, 1893) 
 Dipleuchlanis ornata Segers, 1993

References

Rotifer genera
Ploima